Hammergren is a surname. Notable people with the surname include:

David I. Hammergren (1875–1944), American politician
John Hammergren (born 1959), American businessman

See also
Hammargren